Sheridan High School is a public high school in Thornville, Ohio.  The school is located in Northern Perry County.  Sheridan High School's teams are known as the Generals, and the school colors are red and gray.

Three area schools (Glenford, Somerset, and Thornville) were combined in 1960 to form the Northern Local School District.  Sheridan High School became the only high school in the new district.  When the high school opened in 1960, there were 378 students enrolled in the school.

Notable alumni
Duane Theiss, professional baseball player

References

External links
 District website

High schools in Perry County, Ohio
Public high schools in Ohio
Educational institutions established in 1960
1960 establishments in Ohio